Lydia D'Ustebyn's Ladies Swing Orchestra was a British feminist swing band of all female musicians. Lydia D'Ustebyn was not a real person, but a fictional character based on Ivy Benson - a famous London woman band leader. The band would frequently apologize that Lydia was absent from performances, because she had "missed the train."

Personnel
 Alison Rayner- Bass
 Angele Veltmyer- Tenor Sax
 Annie Whitehead- Trombone
 Barbara Snow- Trumpet
 Deirdre Cartwright- Guitar
 Josphina Cupido- Drums
 Julia Doyle- Double Bass
 Laka Daisical (Dorota Koc)- Piano and vocals
 Lesley ??- Baritone Sax
 Linda da Mango- Percussion
 Ruthie Smith- Alto Saxophone
 Virginia Betts- Trumpet

References

External links

Feminist artists
British jazz ensembles
Swing musicians